Ivett Gonda (born April 28, 1986 in Jászberény, Hungary) is a Hungarian-born Canadian retired taekwondo competitor.  She moved to Canada when she was four. From 1995 to mid 2013 Gonda competed professionally for Canada until she decided to compete for her native country, Hungary. Though currently competing for another nation, Ivett still continues to train and live in Canada.

Career
She began taekwondo in 1995. She was the second Canadian ever to make the Olympic team in 2004.
She finished in fifth place at the 2003 World Championships in Garmisch-Partenkirchen, Germany in the Finweight-47 kg event.

2008 Summer Olympics
Gonda is part of the three member Canadian Olympic team at the Summer Olympic Games in Taekwondo along with Karine Sergerie & Sébastien Michaud.

On August 20, 2008 Gonda faced Hanna Zajc of Sweden in her first bout at the Beijing olympics and lost 2-0 in a controversial upset. The outcome of the match stirred immediate controversy as Gonda had landed numerous strikes which were arguably scoring blows including a clear head-shot that knocked down Zajc and would have given Gonda 2 points had it been accepted by the judges. Gonda's coach, Shin Wook Lim protested during and after the match, but was ignored by judges who refused interviews and comments through intermediaries. Lim has suggested that Lei Zhao, a Chinese judge, one of four judges scoring the match, and head of the Chinese Taekwondo federation intentionally ignored Gonda's scoring to see the 33rd ranked Zajc advance to face a Chinese competitor in the next round instead of Gonda, widely reported as a medal contender prior to the bout and ranked 3rd in the world. Olympic taekwondo uses electronic clickers to tally points. Three of four judges must click in a point within a short interval for points to be tallied. Thus any conspiracy of two is sufficient to nullify any points scored. In conclusion, she still lost.

Continued career
Gonda was a participant at the 2011 Pan American Games where she won a gold medal in the competition and so did Olivier Pineau (heayweight division) and Melanie Phan(fly weight division).

Career Highlights

2007 Pan American Games: Bronze
2007 World Championship: 9th
2006 Canadian Senior National Championships: Gold
2006 Senior Pan American Championship: Bronze
2005 Canadian Senior National Championships: Gold
2005 World Championship: 5th
2004 Canadian Senior National Championships: Gold
2004 Pan-American Championships: Gold
2004 Olympic Games: 5th
2003 Canadian Senior National Championships: Gold
2003 World Taekwondo Championships: 5th

Awards
Named Most Valuable Player at the 2002 Junior National Championships and the 2006 Senior National Championships

References

https://web.archive.org/web/20081012091103/http://www.combatcanada.ca/forum/index.php?topic=27.0
http://www.olympic.ca/EN/hopefuls/2007/taekwondo.html
https://web.archive.org/web/20121104202844/http://www.canada.com/topics/sports/beijing2008/story.html?id=752e85c7-478b-4661-8269-9f98ae5807c4
http://www.cbc.ca/olympics/taekwondo/story/2008/08/19/f-olympics-taekwondo-gonda.html
http://www.tsn.ca/olympics/story/?id=246955&lid=headline&lpos=secStory_main
http://olympics.thestar.com/2008/article/481950

External links
http://www.olympic.ca/Beijing2008/EN/632/Athletes.htm 
Official Beijing Olympics profile

1986 births
Living people
People from Jászberény
Canadian female taekwondo practitioners
Hungarian female taekwondo practitioners
Olympic taekwondo practitioners of Canada
Taekwondo practitioners at the 2004 Summer Olympics
Taekwondo practitioners at the 2007 Pan American Games
Taekwondo practitioners at the 2008 Summer Olympics
Taekwondo practitioners at the 2011 Pan American Games
Hungarian emigrants to Canada
Taekwondo practitioners at the 2015 European Games
European Games competitors for Hungary
Pan American Games gold medalists for Canada
Pan American Games bronze medalists for Canada
Pan American Games medalists in taekwondo
Universiade medalists in taekwondo
Universiade bronze medalists for Canada
European Taekwondo Championships medalists
Medalists at the 2011 Summer Universiade
Medalists at the 2011 Pan American Games
Sportspeople from Jász-Nagykun-Szolnok County